Apostolepis nelsonjorgei is a species of snake in the family Colubridae. It is endemic to Brazil.

References 

nelsonjorgei
Reptiles described in 2004
Reptiles of Brazil